"All I Do Is Cry" is a song by German singer Kim Petras from her debut album Clarity (2019). First released as the fifth promotional single from the album on 23 May 2019 by BunHead Records, it was re-released two years later on streaming services with a changed date of 2021 under Amigo and Republic Records. Petras released this song among others from the same album in preparation for her North American tour.

Reception
Rolling Stone commented on how the track differed from her previous singles: "Kim Petras veers into moody trap-pop with her new song “All I Do Is Cry.” The singer-songwriter vents about heartbreak throughout the track, which — in contrast to her other, more club-friendly singles — recalls the emo-rap vibe of Juice WRLD". Reviewing it for Interview Magazine, Ernest Macias suggested the song "takes her music to a sad, almost emo direction, laced with trap beats and lyrics bemoaning a broken heart." For Nick Levine in NME, the song "shows her vulnerable side." Writing for The Guardian, Aimee Cliff described the song as "deliciously tragic", while Stephen Daw of Billboard called it "heartbreaking-and-catchy."

Track listing

Credits and personnel
 Written by Kim Petras, Lukasz Gottwald, Aaron Joseph and Nicholas Balding
 Produced by Made in China and Aaron Joseph
 Vocals by Kim Petras

Release history

References

2019 songs
Kim Petras songs
Songs about heartache
Songs written by Dr. Luke
Song recordings produced by Dr. Luke
Songs written by Kim Petras
Songs written by Nic Nac